The Battle of Écija was a battle of the Spanish Reconquista that took place in September 1275.  The battle pitted the Muslim troops of the Nasrid Emirate of Granada and its Moroccan allies against those of the Kingdom of Castile and resulted in a victory for the Emirate of Granada.

The battle
The Nasrid Emirate of Granada was engulfed in a civil war and was regularly devastated by Castilian forces who saw an opportunity for easy plunder due to the distraction of the Muslim forces. Muhammad II asked for help from his Moroccan allies to ease the difficulty of fighting two wars at once. The Sultan, the Marinid Abu Yusuf Yaqub ibn Abd Al-Haqq, landed on the Iberian Peninsula in 1275 with an army and began a campaign with the strategic objective to occupy the city of Tarifa. The Castilian King, Alfonso X of Castile was abroad at the time and the country was ruled by his son, infante Ferdinand acting as regent. He immediately raised some troops and moved south but unexpectedly died of natural causes in Villa Real in August 1275.

On September 8, while marching north, the Muslim forces encountered a Castilian army under the command of Nuño González de Lara "el Bueno", member of the House of Lara and adelantado mayor de Andalucia, who attempted to cut off the Marinid route near the town of Écija. The Marinid forces routed the Castilian army and Nuño González de Lara was killed in the action or shortly thereafter. The Marinid Sultan ordered that Nuño González' head be cut off, sending it as a trophy to the Sultan of Granada, Muhammad II and cementing his alliance with them which would continue for the next few years against the Castilian forces.

In October, a second army led by Archbishop Sancho of Toledo met a similar defeat in the battle of Martos. The kingdom in the end was saved by the infante Sancho of Castile who rallied the Castilian forces. At the end of the year, King Alfonso X of Castile was forced to sign a peace treaty with the Muslims.

See also 
 Nuño González de Lara "el Bueno"
 Alfonso X of Castile
 Reconquista

References 

1275 in Europe
Conflicts in 1275
Ecija
Ecija
Ecija
13th century in Castile
Écija
Ecija
Ecija
13th century in Al-Andalus
   3.   ^ Ibn Abi Zar’ ( 1320 ). Rawd Al Qirtaas ~ Pg 300. Darul Mansur        1972 Edition.